The eighth gubernatorial election for the city of Bangkok, Thailand, was held on 5 October 2008. The election was won by the incumbent Governor Apirak Kosayothin, placing him in his second consecutive four-year term in office, winning 45.93 percent of the vote. Of a total of 4,087,329 eligible voters, 2,214,320 voted, giving a turnout rate of 54.18 percent, lower than the 70 percent target expected by the Election Committee.

Sixteen candidates contested the election. Apirak, candidate for the opposition Democrat Party, was seen as the favourite. Other candidates included Chuwit Kamolvisit, a former massage parlour businessman who also ran in the 2004 election, Prapas Chongsa-nguan, former governor of the Mass Rapid Transit Authority of Thailand and candidate for the People's Power Party, Kriengsak Chareonwongsak, an academic and professor in business administration, and Leena Jangjanja, a businesswoman and lawyer who ran in the previous election and the 2006 senate election.

The sixth elected governor of Bangkok, Apirak is the second to be elected to a second term, after Chamlong Srimuang, governor from 1985–1992, who was incidentally arrested at a polling station early on the election day, on charges of insurrection due to his role as leader of the People's Alliance for Democracy, a group which has staged protests and occupied Government House since August.

Campaign
Apirak's four-year term as governor ended on 28 August 2008. Applications for the post were accepted from 1 to 5 September, and the official list of candidates was announced on 11 September. Campaigning included public speeches by candidates, television interviews, campaign trucks announcing messages through loudspeakers, and most noticeably, a multitude of campaign posters erected on the pavements, some of which fell over and injured pedestrians and motorcyclists.

The more unusual campaigning stunts included Leena's bathing in a canal to reflect the local population's experiences, which ended tragically when her campaign manager drowned. Nearer to the election day, Chuwit caused headline news by punching and kicking a television journalist after an interview.

Chuwit also filed complaints against Apirak, claiming that the appearance of Apirak's name on the Bangkok Metropolitan Administration's election publicity posters violated electoral law. The case was accepted by the Bangkok Election Committee, but a final ruling by the Election Commission would not be heard until after the election.

Results
Polling was organised by the Bangkok Metropolitan Administration under the supervision of the Bangkok Election Commission, with a total budget of over 154 million baht. Voting took place from 08:00 to 15:00 on 5 October at 6,337 polling stations across the fifty districts of the city.

Exit polls by Assumption and Suan Dusit Rajabhat Universities indicated that Apirak had won 44 to 52 percent of the vote by the time the polling stations closed.  The unofficial results, to be submitted to the Election Commission for approval, were announced by the Bangkok City Clerk on midnight.

References

External links
 .
 .
 . (Archived by WebCite at). .
. (Archived by WebCite at https://www.webcitation.org/5bNBiRBDV).
 .
 .
 .
 . (Archived by WebCite at https://www.webcitation.org/5bNKZxGCf).
 .

Bangkok gubernatorial elections
Bangkok
2008 in Bangkok
Bangkok